Edward Jessup (1801 – September 1831) was a farmer and political figure in Upper Canada.

He was born in Upper Canada in 1801, the son of Edward Jessup, Jr. and the grandson of Edward Jessup. He served in the local militia, becoming lieutenant in 1822 and captain in 1828. He was elected to the Legislative Assembly of Upper Canada representing Grenville in 1830. He died in Brockville while still in office in 1831.

His younger brother, Hamilton Dibble, represented Grenville in the Legislative Assembly of the Province of Canada.

References 
Becoming Prominent: Leadership in Upper Canada, 1791-1841, J.K. Johnson (1989)

1801 births
1831 deaths
Members of the Legislative Assembly of Upper Canada
People from Brockville